Jak Anthony Hickman (born 11 September 1998) is an English professional footballer who plays as a defender for Banbury United.

Career
Hickman started his career in the youth system at West Bromwich Albion, where he played for 8 years before signing a scholarship contract with Coventry City. He made his senior debut for the club in an EFL Trophy game against Forest Green Rovers.

On 13 October 2017, Hickman initially joined Mickleover Sports on a one-month loan with fellow Sky Blue Bilal Sayoud. Then in March 2018 he rejoined the non-league side on loan for the remainder of the season.

During the 2018–19 season Hickman had loan spells with Ashton United and Hereford.

On 4 July 2019, Coventry City announced the fining and placing of Hickman on the transfer list, following disparaging comments made against the club made by Hickman in a video that circulated on social media.

Hickman joined Southern League Premier Central side Bromsgrove Sporting on loan on 22 November 2019.

On 6 August 2020, Hickman signed for Bolton Wanderers, on a initial one-year deal and his 
competitive debut came on 8 September in a 2–3 home defeat against Crewe Alexandra in the EFL Trophy. His first goal came on 17 November as he scored Bolton's first goal in a 3–2 win against Newcastle United U21 in the EFL Trophy.

On 5 March 2021, Hickman joined National League side King's Lynn Town on loan for the remainder of the 2020-21 season. He only played once due to injury. On 19 May 2021 Bolton announced he would be released at the end of his contract.

Hickman signed for League of Ireland Premier Division club St Patrick's Athletic on 19 August 2021 until the end of the season in November. He made his debut for the club the following night, replacing Jason McClelland at half-time in a 3–1 defeat against Finn Harps at Finn Park. His first assist for the club came on 3 September when his cross was volleyed in by Chris Forrester in a 3–2 win over Longford Town at Richmond Park. On 28 November 2021 Hickman came off the bench in the 2021 FAI Cup Final, as his side defeated rivals Bohemians 4–3 on penalties following a 1–1 draw after extra time in front of a record FAI Cup Final crowd of 37,126 at the Aviva Stadium.

On 10 December 2021, Hickman signed for Southern League Premier Division Central side Stourbridge. He made a total of 6 appearances for the club before having his contract terminated on 17 January 2022 alongside teammate Montel Gibson after the pair allegedly refused to play in an FA Trophy tie with Guiseley as they wanted to go on trial at two other clubs without Stourbridge's permission.

On 5 February 2022, it was announced that Hickman had signed for National League side King's Lynn Town, a club he had previously spent time on loan at during his time with Bolton Wanderers. He was released at the end of the 2021–22 season following relegation.

On 1 July 2022, Hickman signed for National League North side Banbury United on a one year contract.

Career statistics

Honours
Bolton Wanderers
EFL League Two third-place (promotion): 2020–21

St Patrick's Athletic
FAI Cup: 2021

References

External links

1998 births
Living people
English footballers
Coventry City F.C. players
Mickleover Sports F.C. players
Ashton United F.C. players
Hereford F.C. players
Redditch United F.C. players
Bromsgrove Sporting F.C. players
Bolton Wanderers F.C. players
King's Lynn Town F.C. players
Association football defenders
St Patrick's Athletic F.C. players
Stourbridge F.C. players
English Football League players
Northern Premier League players
National League (English football) players
League of Ireland players
Southern Football League players
Expatriate association footballers in the Republic of Ireland